Government Medical College and Hospital, Bettiah is a government medical college situated at Bettiah, in the West Champaran district of the Indian state of Bihar.This college came into existence into year 2008.

History
It is affiliated with Aryabhatta Knowledge University. The first batch of the college started from year 2013. It has around 1200- 1400 patient flow per day. It was attached with MJK (Maharani Janki Kunwar) hospital which is nearly 100 years old and is the only government hospital and medical training centre of North Bihar. In present time it's named as GMCH BETTIAH.

Bettiah Hospital was established by Maharaja Harendra Kishore of Bettiah Raj in October 1892 AD at a cost of ₹40897, at that time it was called Lady Dufferin Hospital, as we have information, Lady Miss Jenny Mars RCPL RCS (Eidenberg) LRPG (Glasgow) was the first doctor of this. . ,  then after Dr. Marsh appointed in November 1893, when the Maharaja died (26-03-1893).[3]

Lady Miss Jenny Marsh used to get ₹ 250 monthly salary with ₹ 75 monthly allowance at that time, later in this hospital, famous female doctor Miss EB Hallway was appointed, who was a famous surgeon in India, Hallway ward is also named after her in this hospital today. also exists.[4]

After the year 2007, its name was changed to Government Medical College, and from that time arrangements for medical studies started in it and by 2013, the first batch of medical was done in it, in which there were about 100 students. Right now this medical college is fifth in Bihar.[3] [4] [5]

See also

References

External links 
 http://www.gmcbettiah.org/
Aryabhatta Knowledge University

Medical colleges in Bihar
Hospitals in Bihar
Colleges affiliated to Aryabhatta Knowledge University
Educational institutions established in 2013
2013 establishments in Bihar